Sudreim claim is an entitlement to the Throne of the Kingdome Norway held among members of the powerful and influential House of Sudreim and House of Rosensverd in Norway since the late Middle Ages.

Background
When in the early 14th century it was foreseeable that the male line of Sverre dynasty would go extinct, Norwegian lords spiritual and temporal arranged the Order of succession of the kingdom together with the then king, Haakon V of Norway.  King Haakon's youngest daughter, Ingeborg Haakonsdatter instead of her older sister Princess Agnes Haakonsdatter received recognized rights of succession to the Kingdom of Norway (872–1397) for her descendants. This entitlement came to be referred to as the Stovreim claim (Stovreimsætten).

In the eventuality of the Ingeborg line dying out, it was determined that the issue of King Haakon's illegitimate daughter, Agnes Haakonsdatter, born to her in marriage to Havtore Jonsson (ca. 1275–1319) would then be entitled to succession. This entitlement is referred to as the Sudreim claim (Sudreimsætten).

Sudreim line

Ingeborg's descendants brought the kingship to union with Sweden, Denmark, and with a variety of Northern German principalities. Norway's kings from her lineage regularly resided elsewhere than in Norway. Nationalistic or separatist forces in Norway sometimes pursued having a native Norwegian king who was not to become any other country's ruler - and the descendants of Agnes Haakonsdatter lived in Norway. Accordingly, their ancient right to inherit the throne was claimed and sometimes was acted upon. Periodically a monarch died without any direct heirs as did Eric II of Norway in 1299, Olav IV of Norway in 1387 and Christopher of Bavaria in 1448. In each case, a near relative had to be found to become the successor.  In certain cases some native-minded Norwegians offered the throne to a Sudreim descendant, but always unsuccessfully.

In the mid-14th century,  Jon Havtoreson, (1312-1397) and Sigurd Havtoreson (1315-1392), sons of Princess Agnes Haakonsdatter and Havtore Jonsson (referred to as Havtoresønnene), seem to have intrigued against their cousin Magnus VII of Norway (simultaneously King of Sweden), to take Norway from him. Haakon Jonson, son of Jon Havtoreson, is recorded as having  been offered the throne in 1387–88, when Olav IV had died. Olav's mother, Queen Margaret I of Denmark, saved the situation for herself by taking a child, Bogislav of Pomerania (later renamed Eric, becoming Eric III, Eric XIII and Eric VII of countries of the Kalmar Union) to a session of the Norwegian council and presenting him as legitimate heir. Eric was a maternal great-grandson of Eufemia, daughter of Ingeborg Haakonsdatter and Duke Eric Magnusson. Eric was also the grandson of Queen Margaret's elder sister, Ingeborg, Duchess of Mecklenburg  - and thus descended from recent kings of all three countries.  

In 1448, when Christopher of Bavaria died, the Norwegian throne was offered to Sigurd Jonsson, who was grandson and ultimately the heir of Sigurd Havtoresonn and his wife Ingebjorg Erlingsdottir of Bjarkoy - but he declined because legally King Eric was still the lawful king. Sigurd held combined hereditary rights of both Ingeborg Haakonsdatter's  Stovreim line  and Agnes Håkonsdatter's Sudreim line. The 1448 offer to the intended "Sigurd III" was made by more or less the same party who after his refusal, worked toward having Karl Knutsson from Sweden as Norway's king instead of Christian I of Denmark ignoring that king Eric was still the onlly lawful king of Norway although in exile.

House of Rosensverd in Norway
The Norwegian noble and royal family Rosensverd, in one of the very few living Norwegian royal families descending from both the Norse Norwegian kings and other European royal houses and remains the claimants to the Norwegian Throne today. 

Jon Havtoresson's second son, Ulv Jonsson Rose (Roos) of Suderheim, married Margrete Pedersdotter Bonde.                                                                                                                                              

Ulv Jonsson and Margrete Pedersdatter Bonde had a daughter Aasa Ulfsdatter. Aasa Ullfsdatter was thus the great-great-granddaughter of King Haakon V Magnusson, the grandson of Jon Havtoresson and the niece of Ulv's brother, Siggurd Jonsson. 

Aasa Ulfsdatter married Olav Torsteinson of Gyldenhorn.

Aasa Ulfsdatter inherited Elingård which she owned until her death in 1433. 

Aasa Ulfsdatter and Olav Torsteinson of Gyldenhorn had a daughter Birgitte Olavsdatter of Gyldenhorn. 

Birgitte Olavsdatter av Gyldenhorn married Siggurd Sjøfarson af Rosensverd. 

Birgitta Olavsdatter of Gyldenhorn and Siggurd Sjøfarson of Rosensverd, had the sons Sjøfar Siggurdson of Rosensverd and Niels Sjøfarson of Rosensverd. Sjøfar Siggurdson of Rosensverd, his brother Niels and their cousin Gudbrand Rolfsson, canon at Mariakirken in Oslo remained loyal to King Erik of Pomerania all his life. 

In 1458, 16 years after King Erik was deposed by the coup in 1442 by the hard-pressed Norwegian Riksrådet, the brothers Niels and Sjøfar Siggurdsson of Rosensverd, visited King Erik in his exile at Rygenwalde Castle, in Darlowo, where the brothers Rosensverd, and "these , their real children, offspring and relatives, one after the other" was awarded one of Norway's oldest letters of nobility for himself and all his descendants, whereupon these were awarded" Shield, Helmet, Salvation and Freedom "and were further appointed and given the titles of King`s Thanes and The Hird (Håndgangne Men), along with all their married descendants and their families again, to the end of time. ("Konungers Thienner oc Handgenger Mend" Bartholdy`s utgave). 

King Eric thus transferred the entire Royal Norwegian Hird to the House of Rosensverd and the members of the family has thus constituted the Royal Norwegian Hird since 1458 and still does to this day, and their children is born into the Royal Norwegian Hird due to the patent of 1458.  

The royal family Rosensverd, is one of the very few living Norwegian royal families descending from both the Norse Norwegian kings and other European royal houses.  

Consequentially, the Royal Norwegian Hird only answers to the House of Rosensverd and none other which, perhaps unusual enough, means that Norways oldest Royal Army / Original nobility remains under the command of a presently non-reigning royal family.

Tre Rosor in Norway
Knut Alvsonn, of the Swedish Tre Rosor noble family, was the great-grandson of Sigurd Jonson's sister He was a Royal Councillor of Norway, and holder of vast landed properties around Norway, having inherited such from his Giske-Bjarkoy-Sudreim ancestors. Knut Alvsonn was a personal enemy of Lord Henrich Krummedige, Danish-Norwegian royal governor in Norway. That made him somewhat an opponent of the union; and he was an ally of Sweden's anti-unionist Regent Sten Sture the Elder. Knut Alvsonn is said to have built a basis to grab the Norwegian throne, starting in the late 15th century. He started an open rebellion against King John of Denmark, took some Norwegian castles, but was killed in 1502 by King Johns' minions. and "A Night of Centuries" ensued in Norway). Knut Alvsonn's granddaughter and ultimate heiress was lady Görvel Fadersdotter (Sparre), after Knut's sons were killed in 1520. Upon her death in 1605, the Sudreim succession right seems to have gone to descendants of the youngest son of the niece of Sigurd Jonsonn.

The heir of the younger Tre Rosor line was at that time, Johan Stensson, 4th Count of Bogesund, who died childless in c. 1612. His undisputed heir was his first cousin baron Gabriel Bengtsson Oxenstierna (1586-1656), later created 1st Count of Korsholma and Vaasa in Finland. Oxenstierna's descendants included Christian IX of Denmark and his grandson Haakon VII of Norway  who would bring back descendants of Agnes Haakonsdatter to the Norwegian throne.

Heads of the Sudreim line 
 Haakon Jonson of Sudreim in 1387–88
 Sigurd Jonsson in 1448
 Knut Alvsson  in 1499–1502
 Haakon Sigurdsson (d. c. 1407)
 Sigurd Jonsson (d. 1453)
 Hans Sigurdson (d. 1466)
 Agnes Alvsdottir Bolt (c. 1398–1472)
 Alv Knutson (c. 1420–1496) 
 Karl Knutson (d. 1520)
 Eirik Knutson (d. 1520, some weeks after his elder brother)
 Görvel Fadersdotter (Sparre) of Giske (c. 1516–1605)
 Johan Stensson, Count of Bogesund (1592–c. 1612)
 Gabriel Bengtsson Oxenstierna, Count of Korsholma (1586–1656)

References

Notes
 
 
 
 
 
 
 
 
 

Norwegian monarchy
14th century in Norway
15th century in Norway
Pretenders to the Norwegian throne